Méntrida may refer to :
Méntrida (wine), a wine produced in the northeast corner of the province of Toledo, Spain
Méntrida, Toledo, a municipality in the province of Toledo, Spain